Phoenix Fire is the name of:

Phoenix Fire (soccer), 1980 ASL soccer team
Phoenix Fire Office, English insurance company
Phoenix Fire Department, American fire protection service
Phoenix Fire Birds, American baseball team